The following lists events that happened during 1864 in Australia.

Incumbents

Governors
Governors of the Australian colonies:
 Governor of New South Wales – John Young, 1st Baron Lisgar
 Governor of Queensland – Sir George Bowen
 Governor of South Australia – Sir Dominick Daly
 Governor of Tasmania – Colonel Thomas Browne
 Governor of Victoria – Sir Charles Darling
Governor of Western Australia – Dr John Hampton

Premiers
Premiers of the Australian colonies:
 Premier of New South Wales – James Martin
 Premier of Queensland – Robert Herbert
 Premier of South Australia – Henry Ayers until 4 August, then Arthur Blyth
 Premier of Tasmania – James Whyte
 Premier of Victoria – James McCulloch

Arts
Twofold Bay Waltzes by Georgina Isabella O'Sullivan née Keon (1841-1927 daughter of George Plunkett Keon JP, niece of John PlunkettQC)

Events
 1 January – The Queensland Police Force is established and begins operations with approximately 143 employees.
 4 May – The first trout hatchery in the southern hemisphere is established at Plenty, Tasmania.
 14 May – Bushranger Frank Gardiner is sentenced to 32 years in prison, although he is later pardoned by Henry Parkes in 1874.
 20 May – Bushranger Ben Hall and his gang escape from a shootout with police after attempting to rob the Bang Bang Hotel in Koorawatha, New South Wales.
 2 June – The schooner Waratah disappears between Sydney and Newcastle, claiming seven lives.
 1 October – The Australasian (later to be known as Australasian Post) is first published in Melbourne.
 1 December – Great Fire of Brisbane

Sport
 1 January – The All-England Eleven cricket team defeats the Victorian XXII at the Melbourne Cricket Ground.
 Lantern wins the Melbourne Cup.
 Carlton FC was founded

Births

 17 February – Banjo Paterson, bush poet, journalist and author (d. 1941)
 7 April – Alfred Conroy, New South Wales politician (d. 1920)
 18 April – Rose Summerfield, feminist and labour activist (d. 1922)
 10 July – Sir Austin Chapman, New South Wales politician (d. 1926)
 21 August – David O'Keefe, Tasmanian politician (d. 1943)
 21 December – Sir James McCay, Victorian politician and soldier (born in Ireland) (d. 1930)

Deaths

 15 January – Isaac Nathan, composer, musicologist, and journalist (born in the United Kingdom) (b. 1791)
 6 March – Peter Miller Cunningham, naval surgeon and author (born and died in the United Kingdom) (b. 1789)
 25 May – John Joseph Therry, Catholic priest (born in Ireland) (b. 1790)
 19 June – Richard Heales, 4th Premier of Victoria (born in the United Kingdom) (b. 1822)
 24 November – Edward Buckley Wynyard, New South Wales politician and military officer (born and died in the United Kingdom) (b. 1788)

References

 
Australia
Years of the 19th century in Australia